Kevin Nolan (born 19 September 1988) is a Gaelic footballer who formerly played for Kilmacud Crokes and the Dublin county team.

On the field of play, Nolan won a Sigerson Cup with DCU; an All-Ireland Senior Club Football Championship with Kilmacud Crokes; a National Football League and All-Ireland Senior Football Championship with Dublin, winning the man of the match award for his performance in the final of the latter.

Early life
Nolan was raised in the Dún Laoghaire–Rathdown suburb of Monkstown. He attended Holly Park for his education. He played association football with St Joseph's Boys in Sallynoggin. English association football clubs Leicester City and Blackburn Rovers expressed an interest and invited him to go to England for trials. He left that sport due to making progress with the Dublin minor football team.

Playing career

Club
Nolan won the 2008 Dublin Senior Football Championship with Kilmacud Crokes. He then won a Leinster Senior Club Football Championship, Dublin Division One AFL and the All-Ireland Senior Club Football Championship.

He played his last game with Crokes in 2018, when he moved to County Monaghan and began playing for Cremartin.

College
Nolan won a Sigerson Cup with DCU.

Inter-county
Nolan won the Dublin Minor Football Championship.

He made his championship debut for Dublin against Wexford in the final of the 2008 Leinster Senior Football Championship.

He won five further Leinster Senior Football Championships with Dublin: in 2009, 2011, 2012, 2013 and 2014.

Nolan was named the man of the match in the 2011 All-Ireland Senior Football Championship Final, as Dublin won their first title in sixteen years. He was part of the half-back line with James McCarthy and Ger Brennan, and also scored during the final.

However, injury and a medical condition limited his further development as a player.

Jim Gavin called time on Nolan's inter-county career by omitting him from the Dublin panel before the start of the 2015 Championship.

International rules
Nolan won the U-17 International Rules Series with Ireland.

Move away
Nolan later moved from his base in Lucan to County Monaghan (close to Castleblayney) and married Lorna (to whom he became engaged in 2017) in April 2019. He previously suggested an openness to playing for the Monaghan county football team. This never came to be.

References

Living people
DCU Gaelic footballers
Dublin inter-county Gaelic footballers
Gaelic football backs
Gaelic footballers who switched code
Irish schoolteachers
Kilmacud Crokes Gaelic footballers
Science teachers
Winners of one All-Ireland medal (Gaelic football)
People educated at St. Declan's College, Dublin
1988 births